Fergus Stewart McArthur,  (born 27 October 1937) is a former Australian politician who served as a Liberal Party of Australia member of the Australian House of Representatives from February 1984, representing the Division of Corangamite, Victoria until his defeat in the 2007 election by Labor's Darren Cheeseman. He was born in Melbourne, Victoria, and was educated at The Geelong College and then at Cambridge University, where he gained a master's degree. He was a farmer and company director before entering politics. Stewart McArthur and his wife Bev McArthur have a daughter, Sarah, and twin sons, Andrew and James.

He was an advocate for federal funding towards a $26 million redevelopment of the Kardinia Park stadium, despite it being located outside his electorate.

References
Parliament House information page

1937 births
Living people
Liberal Party of Australia members of the Parliament of Australia
Members of the Australian House of Representatives for Corangamite
People educated at Geelong College
21st-century Australian politicians
20th-century Australian politicians
Politicians from Melbourne
Alumni of the University of Cambridge